The Slashtones (also known as "Harry Slash & The Slashtones") are an American musical group, formed in 1993 by New York native Harry Slash under the name "Harry & The Slashtones". Harry would later change the band's name many times, from "The Slashtones", to "Life?!","Not The Slashtones" and then to "Harry Slash & The Slashtones" during the era that Harry Slash produced music for Extreme Championship Wrestling. Their best known songs are the ECW theme ("This Is Extreme!"), Taz's theme ("Survive! (If I Let You)") and Sabu's theme ("Huka Blues"). After Extreme Championship Wrestling went bankrupt in 2001, Harry Slash continued to record and perform with the band after changing its name back to "The Slashtones".
The name of the band is a parody of Béla Fleck and the Flecktones, itself a play on Dick Dale and the Del-Tones.

Band members

Current band

 Harry Slash: Vocals, Slide Guitar & Dulcimer.  1993–present
 Arno Hecht: Saxophone, Clarinet & Recorder. 1994–present
 Mike Lawler: 6 & 12-string Guitars. 1994-1995, 2013–present
 Even Steven Levee: Bass. 1993 - 1995, 1997-1998, 2008, 2013–present
 Taso Karras: Drums, Bouzouki, Baglama & Percussion. 2008, 2013–present
 Steve "Budgie" Werner: Drums and Cowbell. 1997–present.

Honorary band members

 Gregg Gerson: Flute. 1995–present
 Frank Fortune: Vocals. 1998-2008
 Joe Lynn Turner: Vocals. 1994–present

Former band members

 Lisa Anselmo: Vocals. 1994, 1996
 Steve Bondy: Guitar. 1993-1998
 Chris Carter: Guitar. 1995
 Scott DeBoys: Drums. 1995-1996
 Butch Garcia: Harmonica. 1994
 Chuck Hancock (a/k/a "Raven"): Saxophone. 1994-1995
 Felix Hanemann: Bass & Keyboards. 2006-2013
 Mark Hitt: Lead & Rhythm Guitar. 2006-2008
 Roderick Kohn: Guitar. 1993, 1994-1999, 2000-2006
 Mickey Leigh: Guitar. 1999-2001, 2008
 Tony Moore: Bass & Vocals. 1995-1997, 2000, 2002-2008
 Rawn Randell: Bass. 2001
 Brad Rosen Esq.: Harmonica. 1993-1994
 Richie Scarlet: Lead & Rhythm Guitar. 2009-2013
 Paul Sheehan: Drums. 1993-1995
 Amy Wagman: Vocals. 1994
 Lez Warner: Drums. 1994, 1995-1997

Others
-	
The Slashtones have also recorded with:

 Andy Abbene: Guitar. 1997 (Soulcrush)	
 Marianne DeAngelis: Harmonica. 2008
 Artie Dillon: Guitar. 2008
 Frank Fortune: Vocals. 1998 - 2008 (Reckless Fortune)	
 Joey Fortune: Guitar. 2005 - 2008 (Reckless Fortune)
 Francine Fournier: Vocals. 1997. (ECW Wrestler)
 Mac Gollehon: Trumpet & Trumbone. 2006 - 2008 (Miles Davis Band)	
 Mike Lewis: Trumpet. 2005 (Buddy Rich Band)
 Charlie Sabin: Vocals. 2008 (Barfly, Toxik)	
 Frank Sannutto: Drums. 1999 (Reckless Fortune)	
 Ritchie Scarlet: Guitar & Bass. 1997 (Ace Frehley Band, Mountain)
 Garry Sullivan: Drums. 1998 (The B-52's)
 Tazz: Vocals. 1998 (ECW Wrestler)

Discography 

 Episode One (EP), The Slashtones, Studio D (Out Of Print), 1995
 ECW: Extreme Music, Various Artists, Concrete/Slab, 1998
 Freedom Of Speech (EP), Harry Slash & The Slashtones, MP3.com (Out Of Print), 2000
 Fire Woman, A Tribute to The Cult, Various Artists, Versaille, 2000
 "PAIN" (Movie Soundtrack), The Slashtones and Die Nicht, Endstop (Out Of Print.), 2003
 Just Like Paradise, A Millennium Tribute to David Lee Roth, Various Artists, Versaille, 2005
 It's So Easy, A Millennium Tribute to Guns N' Roses, Various Artists, Versaille, 2006
 Three Lock Box, A Millennium Tribute to Sammy Hagar, Various Artists, Versaille, 2006
 Panama, A Millennium Tribute to Van Halen, Various Artists, Versaille, 2006
 Too Fast For Love, A Millennium Tribute to Mötley Crüe, Various Artists, Versaille, 2007
 Lick It Up, A Millennium Tribute to KISS, Various Artists, Versaille, 2008
 Double Talkin' Jive, A Hard Rock Tribute to Guns N' Roses, Various Artists, Versaille, 2008
 Misty Mountain Hop, A Millennium Tribute to Led Zeppelin, Various Artists, Versaille, 2008

References

External links
Official website
Official MySpace page

Musical groups established in 1993
Heavy metal musical groups from New York (state)
1993 establishments in New York City